During the early morning of December 5, 2016 a fire broke out in Karachi, Pakistan's Regent Plaza luxury hotel. While over 500 guests were safely evacuated from the building, 12 died of smoke inhalation and 110 were injured by falls, broken glass and smoke.

Regent Plaza hotel
Regent Plaza is a 10-story tall hotel located on Shahrah-e-Faisal in Karachi, Pakistan. The hotel has 8 floors dedicated to rooming guests, with 413 rooms and 20 suits.

Incident

Fire
Regent Plaza staff called emergency services around 3:00 AM to report fire breaking out in the main kitchen. Hotel chief security officer Mohammad Saad said to the media that "We suspect the fire started in one of our freezers on the ground floor" after a short circuit. The hotel's concrete structure prevented the flames from spreading into the upper floors, but copious amounts of toxic smoke were generated by burning materials in the kitchen and dining areas. Some evacuated guests claimed to have woken up to fire and smoke between 3:00 and 3:30 am, by smoke coming in to the rooms through the central air-conditioning system.

As hotel staff evacuated over 500 guests from the building the hotel's air conditioning systems remained on, allowing the smoke to spread via ventilation throughout the upper floors. Despite the fire not spreading into the upper floors of the building, smoke obstructed primary escape routes causing many guests to escape via their windows. The fire was contained around 9:30 am (4:30 GMT).

Evacuation
Though the Regent Plaza hotel reportedly had 3 fire exits per floor, they were unlabeled. Regent Plaza was gradually being filled with smoke by the air conditioning system that remained on. Hotel staff worked to evacuated hundreds of guests, while many other guests remained asleep and unaware of the danger. According to Chief Fire Office Tehseen Siddiqui "No fire exits had been marked inside the hotel. The smoke detectors are there, but they aren't functioning. The fire alarm did not go off." However, Karachi's Mayor Waseem Akhtar told reporters that the hotel had "no fire exits or fire alarms".

Guests trapped in their hotel's upper floors who found the hallways obstructed by smoke tied their bedsheets together into rope ladders, using them to climb down the hotel's sides. Some guests, including a Pakistani cricket player, fell and injured themselves escaping this way. A hotel guest told reporters that she evacuated by crossing a ladder across the rooftops, while about 100 others were rescued via a crane. A local TV channel Abb Takk reported that 200 local and foreign doctors had been staying in the hotel for a seminar, allowing many to attempt to provide medical assistance. For those that were trapped on higher levels, many had to be rescued from balconies and rooms after waiting for almost three hours.

Aftermath
In the initial aftermath of the incident, a doctor at Jinnah Hospital in Karachi stated there were " 11 dead bodies and 75 people injured..." Later that evening, a 12th person was found in a 2nd floor washing machine room. 12 people in total perished, all from smoke inhalation, including 3 doctors and the hotel's front desk manager.

In the evacuation panic, at least 65 guests had injured themselves stampeding down stairways or jumping from the upper floors. Over the next day, the number of injured grew from 75 to 110 as more people were checked in at Jinnah Hospital. Police Senior Superintended Saqib Memon confirmed that the fire took 3 hours in total to bring under control. The United Bank Limited cricket team players who were playing in the Quaid-e-Azam Trophy Super Eight tie were also injured in the incident. UBL's all-rounder Yasim Murtaza suffered ankle break while leg-spinner Karamat Ali received injuries to his hand. Meanwhile, right-arm fast-bowlers Adil Raza and Sadaif Mehdi suffered from smoke inhalation.

Some guests were critical of the evacuation and first responders efforts during the fire, and claimed there were long periods of time without aid or direction. One victim stated; "Four to five hours everybody was looking helpless, crying for help and nobody was there to help them."

References 

2016 fires in Asia
2016 in Pakistan
2010s in Karachi
Hotel fires
Fires in Pakistan
December 2016 events in Pakistan